KRRK (100.7 FM, "The Classic Rock Station") is a radio station broadcasting a classic rock music format. Licensed to Lake Havasu City, Arizona, United States, it serves the Mohave County, Arizona, area.  The station is currently owned by Murphy Broadcasting, licensed to Smoke and Mirrors LLC, and features programming from Westwood One.

History
On June 15, 2011, KRRK moved from 101.1 FM to 100.7 FM.

Translators

External links
 Murphy Broadcasting
 

RRK
RRK
Country radio stations in the United States
Lake Havasu City, Arizona
Radio stations established in 1981